The following is a production discography of American record producer DJ Muggs. It includes a list of songs produced, co-produced and remixed by year, title, artist and album.

Production credits

Remixes

References

External links

Production discographies
 
Song recordings produced by DJ Muggs